Elections to Belfast City Council were held on 30 May 1973 on the same day as the other Northern Irish local government elections. The election used eight district electoral areas to elect a total of 51 councillors.

The elections were the first following the reorganisation of local government in Northern Ireland, brought about by the Local Government (Boundaries) Act (Northern Ireland) 1971 & Local Government Act (Northern Ireland) 1972, which replaced the previous FPTP ward system with a new system of proportional representation using multi-member district electoral areas.

The Ulster Unionist Party maintained its position as the largest party, winning just short of a majority, and William Christie continued as Lord Mayor.

Results by party

Districts summary

|- class="unsortable" align="centre"
!rowspan=2 align="left"|Ward
! % 
!Cllrs
! % 
!Cllrs
! %
!Cllrs
! %
!Cllrs
! %
!Cllrs
! %
!Cllrs
! %
!Cllrs
!rowspan=2|TotalCllrs
|- class="unsortable" align="center"
!colspan=2 bgcolor="" | UUP
!colspan=2 bgcolor="" | Alliance
!colspan=2 bgcolor=""| SDLP
!colspan=2 bgcolor="" | NILP
!colspan=2 bgcolor="" | RC
!colspan=2 bgcolor="" | DUP
!colspan=2 bgcolor="white"| Others
|-
|align="left"|Area A
|bgcolor="40BFF5"|55.4
|bgcolor="40BFF5"|4
|10.6
|1
|5.2
|0
|6.1
|1
|0.0
|0
|8.2
|0
|14.5
|1
|7
|-
|align="left"|Area B
|bgcolor="40BFF5"|62.3
|bgcolor="40BFF5"|5
|19.6
|1
|0.0
|0
|5.4
|0
|0.0
|0
|0.0
|0
|12.7
|0
|7
|-
|align="left"|Area C
|bgcolor="40BFF5"|54.7
|bgcolor="40BFF5"|4
|22.8
|2
|4.5
|0
|4.7
|0
|2.4
|0
|0.0
|0
|10.9
|0
|6
|-
|align="left"|Area D
|7.0
|0
|19.3
|1
|bgcolor="#99FF66"|44.5
|bgcolor="#99FF66"|4
|4.0
|0
|18.2
|1
|0.0
|0
|7.0
|0
|6
|-
|align="left"|Area E
|bgcolor="40BFF5"|39.9
|bgcolor="40BFF5"|1
|7.4
|1
|7.3
|0
|10.2
|1
|0.0
|0
|13.5
|1
|21.7
|2
|6
|-
|align="left"|Area F
|bgcolor="40BFF5"|49.2
|bgcolor="40BFF5"|3
|3.8
|0
|18.7
|1
|2.5
|0
|16.1
|1
|7.5
|1
|2.2
|0
|6
|-
|align="left"|Area G
|bgcolor="40BFF5"|56.6
|bgcolor="40BFF5"|3
|3.3
|1
|16.5
|1
|3.9
|0
|4.8
|0
|0.0
|0
|14.9
|0
|6
|-
|align="left"|Area H
|bgcolor="40BFF5"|62.0
|bgcolor="40BFF5"|5
|15.9
|1
|14.8
|1
|4.7
|0
|0.0
|0
|0.0
|0
|2.6
|0
|7
|-
|- class="unsortable" class="sortbottom" style="background:#C9C9C9"
|align="left"| Total
|50.7
|25
|13.4
|8
|11.4
|7
|5.5
|2
|4.0
|2
|2.3
|2
|12.7
|5
|51
|-
|}

Districts results

Area A

1973: 4 x UUP, 1 x Alliance, 1 x Vanguard, 1 x NILP

Area B

1973: 5 x UUP, 1 x Alliance, 1 x United Loyalist

Area C

1973: 4 x UUP, 2 x Alliance

Area D

1973: 4 x SDLP, 1 x Alliance, 1 x Republican Clubs

Area E

1973: 1 x UUP, 1 x DUP, 1 x NILP, 1 x Alliance, 1 x United Loyalist, 1 x Independent Unionist

Area F

1973: 3 x UUP, 1 x SDLP, 1 x DUP, 1 x Republican Clubs

Area G

1973: 3 x UUP, 1 x SDLP, 1 x Alliance, 1 x Independent Unionist

Area H

1973: 5 x UUP, 1 x Alliance, 1 x SDLP

References

1973
1973 Northern Ireland local elections
20th century in Belfast